The Grand Isle School is a PreK-12 school in Grand Isle, a community in unincorporated Jefferson Parish, Louisiana. It is a part of Jefferson Parish Public Schools.

References

External links
 
 Grand Isle School (Archive)

Public K-12 schools in Louisiana
Schools in Jefferson Parish, Louisiana